Dame Rachel Mary de Souza  (née Kenny 1968 at Scunthorpe, Lincolnshire) is a British educationalist, and former headteacher. 

The founding chief executive of the Inspiration Trust she served in that role until March 2021, when she took up the post of Children's Commissioner for England. 

De Souza was appointed DBE in the 2014 New Year Honours "for services to education".

Personal life
Born at Scunthorpe in 1968, Rachel Kenny was the middle child among three brothers; her father was a steelworker, her mother a refugee. She attended a local Catholic comprehensive school before graduating as BA in Philosophy and Theology from Heythrop College, University of London. de Souza then received a PGCE at King's College London before moving with her husband to Oxford, where he pursued further studies at Jesus College.

Career 
De Souza taught in Oxfordshire, Tower Hamlets and Luton Sixth Form College, later serving as deputy head at Denbigh High School, Luton.

Her first headship was at Barnfield West Academy in Luton, before being appointed principal of Ormiston Victory Academy (Costessey, Norwich).

In 2012, she co-founded the Inspiration Trust, a multi academy trust based in Norwich. The Trust opened with a single school in Great Yarmouth but has since grown to include 14 schools across Norfolk and Suffolk. The Trust includes sponsor academies, converter academies, and free schools, with age range from nursery to sixth form.

In December 2020, the Second Johnson ministry nominated de Souza for the post of Children's Commissioner for England, the most powerful child protection post in the country. Later that month, at a time when numerous Children's Commissioners, including those for Wales and Scotland, had already committed to banning corporal punishment against children, de Souza was criticised for failing to do so. However early into her role having started on 1 March 2021 she said she was against violence of any form towards children and in an article for the Times 20 April 2022 she said she was supportive of a ban being introduced in England.

In March 2021 she announced plans for the Children’s Commission; a post-Covid and beyond investigation and report formulating policy ideas for the next decade to improve children’s lives and opportunities. It was pre-ceded on 19 April 2021 by "The Big Ask" a survey that was promoted and launched by international footballer and children’s campaigner Marcus Rashford. Over 6 weeks the survey gathered 557 077 individual responses making it the largest detailed survey of children ever conducted in England.

In response to Ofsted’s Review of sexual abuse in schools and colleges on 10 June 2021, which was prompted by the Everyone’s Invited movement, de Souza was commissioned by Government to review online safety for children with a focus on the prevalence of sexualised content. Over the following 3 months the Children’s Commissioner’s met with the owners and administrators of adult content sites, all major social media companies and content sharing platforms and on 1 December 2021 co-chaired a meeting with Nadine Dorries, Secretary of State for Culture, Media and Sport, and Nadhim Zahawi, Secretary of State for Education and Will Quince, Children’s Minister  and senior representatives of the 8 largest internet and social media companies to urge greater protections for children and support for the Online Safety Bill. De Souza has campaigned for robust age limits on adult content sites, and would like to see age verification on sites that children already engage with and use. 

In early 2022 as Covid restrictions lifted in the UK de Souza announced her office would research and explore how to get children either persistently absent from school, or out of school altogether, back into classrooms. Her work on Attendance and finding children and encouraging and supporting them back into education is ongoing.

References

1968 births
Living people
Alumni of Heythrop College
Alumni of King's College London
People from Scunthorpe
English people of Irish descent
Heads of schools in England
British women chief executives
Schoolteachers from Lincolnshire
British Roman Catholics
Children's rights in the United Kingdom
Children's Commissioners for England
Dames Commander of the Order of the British Empire